A leadership election for the presidency of The Republicans (LR) was held on 10 December 2017, the first since the refoundation of the party in 2015, before which it was known as the Union for a Popular Movement (UMP), and seventh overall including the UMP congresses.

The leadership election followed the 2017 presidential election, in which its candidate François Fillon, the party nominee after winning the 2016 presidential primary, was eliminated in the first round. The party suffered further losses in the subsequent legislative elections, and the appointment of several right-wing ministers to the government of newly elected president Emmanuel Macron led to a split between "constructive" personalities and hardliners within the party, culminating in the expulsion of six prominent supporters and members of the government from The Republicans.

With the presidency of the party officially vacant since Fillon won the primary in November 2016, the political bureau of the party scheduled a leadership election a leadership election for 10 December 2017, with a second round on 17 December if no candidate secured a majority of the vote in the first round.

In a single-round vote on 10 December 2017, Laurent Wauquiez was elected by a wide margin, securing 74.64% of votes with turnout of just under 100,000 members, with his opponents Florence Portelli and Maël de Calan posting only marginal scores. Wauquiez was the only major politician from the party to stand in the leadership election, which Xavier Bertrand and Valérie Pécresse declined to contest. Following the result, Bertrand, the president of the regional council of Hauts-de-France, announced his departure from the party, noting his disagreement with Wauquiez's hard-right line.

Background 

On 30 May 2015, the Union for a Popular Movement (UMP) was refounded as The Republicans (LR), an initiative of Nicolas Sarkozy preceding the 2016 presidential primary for the 2017 presidential election. Sarkozy presided over the party until 23 August 2016, when he declared his candidacy in the presidential primary, after which Laurent Wauquiez was appointed as interim president and Éric Woerth as general secretary of the party in accordance with its statutes. The presidency of the party became vacant on 29 November after the primary was won by François Fillon, who appointed Bernard Accoyer as general secretary and Wauquiez as 1st vice president.

In the first round of the 2017 presidential election, Fillon suffered a historic defeat, with the right eliminated in the first round for the first time in the history of the Fifth Republic amid "Penelopegate". In the subsequent legislative elections, the right suffered further losses, losing nearly a hundred deputies, its worst score in the history of the Fifth Republic.

Following the election of Emmanuel Macron as president under the banner of En Marche! and the subsequent appointment of three right-wing personalities in prominent posts in the newly formed government – Édouard Philippe as Prime Minister, Bruno Le Maire as French Ministry for the Economy and Finance, and Gérald Darmanin as Minister of Public Action and Accounts – a parliamentary group including LR dissidents supportive of the government, "The Constructives", was formed in the National Assembly, separate from the existing LR group. Many LR figures called for the exclusion of the three ministers as well as Sébastien Lecornu, Thierry Solère, and Franck Riester, from the party. On 11 July, Accoyer announced that a "special commission" would "collect the explanations" of the six, postponing the exclusion decision until the autumn. On 24 October, Le Maire confirmed that he left The Republicans for La République En Marche. Darmamin, Lecornu, Solère, and Riester were formally excluded by the political bureau of the party on 31 October; Philippe was not formally excluded due to juridicial reasons, though the party noted his departure. On 25 November, Darmamin, Lecornu, and Solère announced they joined La République En Marche, while Riester founded a new centre-right party, Agir.

On 11 July, the political bureau of The Republicans agreed to hold a leadership election for the new president of the party on 10 and 17 December, with nominations closing on 11 October. Voting was held for 24 hours starting from 20:00 CET on 9 December in order to allow members of the party to vote regardless of their location, and be held in the same manner a week later if a second round was necessary.

Candidates 
Candidates for the presidency of The Republicans were required to submit applications for their candidacies with sponsorships to the High Authority of the party by 11 October 2017. To be considered valid, applications required the sponsorship of at least 1% of party adherents (i.e., a minimum of 2,347) within at least 15 different departmental federations, without more than a fifth of sponsors originating from any single federation, in addition to at least 5% of LR parliamentarians in the deputies, senators, or MEPs (i.e., at least 13 parliamentarians). The list of official candidates was released by the High Authority on 26 October after the validation of sponsorships, marking the beginning of the official campaign, which ended at midnight on 8 December; in the event that a second round was needed, the official campaign would have continued from 11 to 15 December.

Validated

Invalidated 
Daniel Fasquelle, deputy for Pas-de-Calais's 4th constituency, president of the LR federation of Pas-de-Calais, and vice president of the Economic Affairs Committee in the National Assembly; declared candidacy on 26 August, deemed ineligible because of insufficient sponsorships on 26 October

Renounced 
Envisaged candidacies
Xavier Bertrand, president of the regional council of Hauts-de-France; considered candidacy before renouncing on 25 June
Roger Karoutchi, senator for Hauts-de-Seine; considered candidacy before renouncing and announcing sponsorship of Wauquiez's candidacy on 28 September
Valérie Pécresse, president of the regional council of Île-de-France; announced that she would not run on 9 July
Bruno Retailleau, president of The Republicans group in the Senate; considered the possibility on 11 July but did not take further action
Candidacies announced but later aborted
Julien Aubert, deputy for Vaucluse's 5th constituency; declared candidacy on 3 September, but renounced on 11 October after failing to secure enough sponsorships (claimed 13 parliamentarians and 2,211 adherents)
Laurence Sailliet, member of the political bureau of the party; declared candidacy on 9 July, but renounced on 9 October after failing to secure enough sponsorships (claimed 14 parliamentarians and 1,800 adherents)

Opinion polling 
Because the number of paying members of the party constitutes only a small proportion of the French population, no surveys have explicitly surveyed voting intentions. However, surveys have been conducted among all French, including supporters of The Republicans and the right and centre, on the candidate they would support in the leadership election.

Among LR supporters

Among all French

Hypothetical polling 
Among LR supporters

Among right/centre supporters

Among all French

Results

By department

Aftermath 
On 11 December 2017, following the election of Laurent Wauquiez as president of the party, Xavier Bertrand, president of the regional council of Hauts-de-France, announced that he would "definitively quit" The Republicans. Appearing on France 2, he stated that he no longer recognized his party and therefore decided to leave it the evening of the election, having already been critical of Wauquiez's failure to clearly commit against the extreme-right and engagement with the FN. Bertrand said that he did not intend to join or create a political party, adding that "my party is the Hauts-de-France region". Wauquiez's victory was met with relative silence among political personalities of the moderate right, with no acknowledgement or congratulation to Valérie Pécresse and Christian Estrosi silent, and Alain Juppé merely noting that the election produced a "victory without surprise". Prior to the election, Jean-Christophe Lagarde, president of the Union of Democrats and Independents (UDI), stated that there would no longer be an alliance between the two parties in the case of a Wauquiez victory.

On 13 December, Wauquiez unveiled his selections for the leadership of the party, with Virginie Calmels, Guillaume Peltier, and Damien Abad appointed as vice presidents, Annie Genevard appointed as secretary general, in addition to six deputy secretaries general and spokespersons. Wauquiez will meet with Pécresse later in the week.

See also 

The Republicans (France) presidential primary, 2016
Aubervilliers Congress

Notes

References

External links 
Information on the candidates in the leadership election 
Information on the regulations of the leadership election 

2017 elections in France
December 2017 events in France
Political party leadership elections in France
The Republicans (France)
The Republicans (France) leadership election